The Hartford Lightning was a minor league basketball team of the American Professional Basketball League.

History 
Based in the Hartford, Connecticut, The Lightning played just one season (2011-12) before ceasing operations. After a successful 11-3 regular season Hartford were defeated in the league semifinal by the Beltway Bombers.

References

External links
 Hartford Lightning official website

American Professional Basketball League teams
Defunct basketball teams in Connecticut
Sports teams in Hartford, Connecticut
Basketball teams established in 2011
2011 establishments in Connecticut
2012 disestablishments in Connecticut
Basketball teams disestablished in 2012